David Storrier (25 October 1872 – 27 January 1910) was a Scottish footballer who played for Arbroath, Everton, Celtic, Dundee, Millwall Athletic and Scotland. Storrier cost a Scottish record transfer fee of £320 in 1898 when Celtic signed him from Everton (where he played on the losing side in the 1897 FA Cup Final), and he went on to win the Scottish Cup in 1899 and 1900 with the Glasgow club. He was a keen cricketer, playing at Scottish county level; he suffered a serious injury in 1902 when struck on the head by a ball.

See also
List of Scotland national football team captains

References

Sources

External links

1872 births
1910 deaths
Scottish footballers
Footballers from Angus, Scotland
People from Arbroath
Association football fullbacks
Scotland international footballers
Arbroath F.C. players
Everton F.C. players
Celtic F.C. players
Dundee F.C. players
Scottish Football League players
English Football League players
Scottish Football League representative players
Millwall F.C. players

FA Cup Final players